5th Army Corps may refer to:

 5th Army Corps (France)
 5th Army Corps (Italy)
 5th Army Corps (Russian Empire)
5th Army Corps (Armenia)